Kirill Aleksandrovich Zinovich (born 5 March 2003) is a Belarusian footballer who plays as an attacking midfielder for Portuguese club Vitória de Guimarães B.

Club career
On 2 July 2021, he signed a 5-year contract with Russian Premier League club FC Lokomotiv Moscow. He made his European debut for Lokomotiv on 25 November 2021 in an Europa League game against Lazio. He made his RPL debut on 29 November 2021 in a game against FC Arsenal Tula.

On 1 September 2022, Zinovich signed a three-year contract with Vitória de Guimarães in Portugal.

Personal life
His brother Dzmitry Zinovich is also a professional footballer.

Career statistics

References

External links

2003 births
Living people
Belarusian footballers
Belarus youth international footballers
Belarus under-21 international footballers
Association football midfielders
FC Minsk players
FC Lokomotiv Moscow players
Vitória S.C. B players
Belarusian Premier League players
Russian Second League players
Russian Premier League players
Belarusian expatriate footballers
Expatriate footballers in Russia
Belarusian expatriate sportspeople in Russia
Expatriate footballers in Portugal
Belarusian expatriate sportspeople in Portugal